Ramayan is a Hindi TV series that was aired on Zee TV in 2001. It is a television adaptation of the ancient Indian epic of the same name, and is primarily based on Valmiki's Ramayana, Tulsidas' Ramcharitramanas , Kalidasa's Raghuvaṃśa and Kambar's Kambh Ramayana . It was produced and directed by Baldev Raj Chopra and Ravi Chopra.

The scripting for the series was done by Ram Govind and Research was done by Satish Bhatnagar, Hasan Kamal and Shafiq Ansari. Dharam Chopra was the Director of Photography.

Each episode started with a title song sung by Vinod Rathod and ended with a doha or couplet sung by Manoj Mishra and written by Maya Govind.

Premise

The show starts with Introduction of King Dashrath followed by his grave for not having a son. Guru Vashisht suggests him to go to rishi shringi. King Dashrath goes in search for rishi Shringi, After many hardships, he convinces Rishi Shring for Santati Yagya. After completion of the yagya, King Dashrath has four sons, Ram, Bharat, Laxman and Shatrughan. It covers several scenes from the Maharishi Valmiki's Ramayana. Scenes of Ram going to gurukul and coming back are shown. Sita's swayamwar and Ram-Sita Marriage is also shown here. Along with them , the brothers of Ram - Lakshman, Bharat and Shatrughn married the sister and cousins of Sita - Urmila, Mandavi and Shrutakirti respectively.
The brides were welcomed in Ayodhya.
Soon afterward Dasharath desired to crown Ram as the king of Ayodhya. Manthara poisoned Kaikeyi's mind against Dasharath's idea.
Recalling that Dasharath had once promised to grant kaikeyi any two boons that she asked of him, she demanded that Ram should be exiled to the forest for fourteen years and that Bharat should be crowned ruler instead. Although heartbroken, Dasharath is compelled to keep his word. Reluctantly, he asks Ram to leave for the forest. Ram happily accepts the exile and leaves for the forest. Ram reluctantly accepts the company of his wife, Sita, and his younger brother, Lakshman. When Bharat learns that his mother is responsible for Ram's exile, he follows Ram and begs him to return with him to Ayodhya. However, Ram refuses, bound by his duty to carry out his father's promise. Bharat decides instead to bring back to the palace Rama's paduka and places them on the throne as a gesture that Ram is the true king. He decided to spend an ascetic life like Ram and Lakshman staying in Nandigram at the outskirts of Ayodhya till the end of exile. Upon his insistence , Shatrughn ruled as his proxy over Ayodhya throughout the fourteen-year exile. Ram, Sita, and Lakshman wandered in the forests, combating evil wherever they encounter it. They gained the blessings of numerous wise men and sages along the way. Thirteen years into the exile, Ravan, the King of Lanka, abducts Sita. In their search of her, Ram and Lakshman meet Hanuman, Sugriv, Jamvanta, and the Vanar Sena. When they reach Lanka, Rama battles Ravan and ultimately kills him, signifying triumph of good over evil. Lord Ram returns back to Ayodhya and is declared the King of Ayodhya. The series end with coronation of Lord Ram.

Episodes
There were total of 48 episodes which were aired every Sunday at 9AM.

Episode guide

Baal Kaand (Episode 1 to Episode 5) 
Episode 1-King Dashrath's Early life. Dasharatha asks Guru Vashisht for help in performing a yagna (sacrifice) to obtain children. Lord Shri Vishnu asks Goddess Lakshmi to incarnate with him.
Episode 2- Completion of Santati Yagya. Ravan's Introduction, King Janak asks lord Shiva for a child.
Episode 3- Lord Shri Vishnu is born as Ram. King Dashrath is blessed with three more sons.
Episode 4- Guru Vashishth is called for the naming ceremony of the King Dashrath's four sons. The four children leave for Ashram.
Episode 5- Goddess Lakshmi is born as Sita.

Ayodhya Kaand (Episode 6 to Episode 20)
Episode 6- Sage Vishwamitra's sacrifices are being disturbed by Taraka, a yaksha demoness
Episode 7- King Dashrath is eagerly waiting for Lord Ram to come back.
Episode 8- Taraka Vadh, Ahilya udhaar
Episode 9- Janak invites Sage Vishwamitra to Sita's swayamvara. Vishwamitra brings Ram and Lakshman along.
Episode 10- Ram and Sita meet in a flower meadow and are smitten. Sita prays to Goddess Gauri. Gauri promises Sita that Ram will be her husband.
Episode 11- Ravan goes to the swayamvara and fails to lift the bow. Shri Ram lifts shiv dhnush, Jaimala Happens
Episode 12- Parshuram is aware of the bow being moved and comes to confront Ram. He is appeased by Lakshman who explains Ram respects Lord Shiva. Wedding preparations begin.
Episode 13- Janak sends his minister to ayodhya, Baarat comes to mithila, Sage Vishwamitra proposes that Sita's three sisters marry Ram's three brothers.
Episode 14- Ram and Sita Vivah
Episode 15- Baarat comes back to Ayodhya
Episode 16- Dasharatha wants to retire and crown Ram king. Ram thinks Bharat would be a better choice.
Episode 17- Bharat is summoned to visit Keikeyi's parents, who are ill. The court decides Ram should be king.
Episode 18- Manthara urges Keikeyi to use her two unfulfilled boons to prevent Ram's coronation.
Episode 19- Keikeyi asks Dasharatha to fulfill her two boons by (1) crowning Bharat and (2) sending Ram into exile for 14 years. Dasharatha is devastated.
Episode 20 Ram says as a dutiful son he must help his father keep his promises. Ram asks Keikeyi to bless him

Aaranya Kaand (Episode 21 to Episode 31)
Episode 21- Laxman and Sita resolves to accompany Ram into exile. Dasharatha never wants to see Keikeyi again.
Episode 22- Dasharatha dies of grief. Bharat and Shatrughan arrive home and are devastated to hear of their brothers' exile and their father's death. Bharat refuses the crown and decides to bring Ram back.
Episode 23- Shri Ram blesses Kevat and Nishadraaj.
Episode 24- Keikeyi mourns. Shri Ram, Devi Sita and Lakshman visit Sage Bhardwaj at Prayag, the confluence of the three sacred rivers: Ganges, Yamuna and Saraswati.
Episode 25- Devi Sita's father Janak hears all the news, including that Bharat has gone after Ram and taken the army. Janak heads after them.
Episode 26- Shri Ram, Devi Sita and Lakshman visit Sage Valmiki, who is writing Ram's life story, in Chitrakoot. Ram- Bharat milaap.
Episode 27- Bharat tells Shri Ram that Dasharatha has died. But Shri Ram insists on keeping his father's promise and refuses to return. Bharat promises to rule as regent only and takes Ram's charan paaduka to place on the throne.
Episode 28- The demi-god vulture Jatayu directs Shri Ram to a dwelling place at Panchavati. Ravan's sister Surpanakha visits her brothers Khar, Dhushan and Trishira who live in a nearby forest. Ram kills some rakshasa demons when he finds them harassing some sages. Curious about this powerful human, Surpanakha visits Panchavati and is smitten with Ram.
Episode 29- A jealous Surpanakha attacks Devi Sita and an angry Lakshman cuts off Surpanakha's nose. Surpanakha returns with her brothers Khar, Dhushan and Trishira and Ram and Lakshman kill all three. Surpanakha tells Ravan who vows revenge and is furious and decides to attack Ram. Ravan asks the magical rakshasa Maricha to help.
Episode 30- Maricha turns into a golden deer and lures Ram far away, trying to catch it for Devi Sita. Maricha then calls for help and Sita, hearing, sends Lakshman. Devi Sita is now alone and Ravan abducts her, killing Jatayu. As Ravan flies through the air, Devi Sita throw down her jewellery.
Episode 31- At Ravan's island kingdom, Lanka, Devi Sita is kept prisoner by Trijata and other demons in a grove. Surpanakha is thrilled, but Ravan's mother and others warn Ravan this will cause trouble. Ram and Lakshman search for Devi Sita.

Kishkindha kaand (Episode 32 to Episode 35)
Episode 32- Ram meets Sugreev, a prince of the Vanar kingdom, and Hanuman, a powerful vanar who is the son of the Wind God Vayu, find Devi Sita's jewellery and show it to Ram.
Episode 33- Sugreev tells his story: he left his brother king Bali who was fighting an asura in a cave, truly thinking that Bali was dead, and took the throne as regent until Bali's son Angad grew up. However, Bali was not dead, and returned angry, beating up Sugreev.
Episode 34-Ram kills Bali for his wrong actions. Sughriv is now the king. A grateful Sugreev orders his army to find Devi Sita.
Episode 35- Sughriv's Vanar sena goes in all directions searching for Devi Sita. Angad, Hanuman and Jambavantha meet Jatayu's brother Sampaati, who tells them Devi Sita is across the sea in Lanka.

Sunderkaand (Episode 36 to Episode 41)
Episode 36- Hanuman flies over the ocean and locates Devi Sita. He also meets the youngest brother of Ravan, Vibhishan, and learns that Vibhishan is also a Ram Bhakt.
Episode 37- Ravan gives Devi Sita a deadline: marry him in one month or she will be forced. Lord Hanuman talks to devi Sita and shows the ring given by lord Ram.
Episode 38- Lord Hanuman goes to Ashok Vatika, Ravan's youngest son Akshaykumar attacks Hanuman and is killed. Meghnad takes Hanuman prisoner. Ravan sets Hanuman's tail on fire. Hanuman burns the city of Lanka to the ground.
Episode 39- Hanuman tells Ram about Ravan's deadline. Ram, Lakshman and Sugreev's army reach the seashore. Vibhishan advises Ravan to return Devi Sita, and Ravan kicks Vibhishan out. Vibhishan joins Ram and tells him how to cross the sea.
Episode 40- Shri Ram setu Nirmaan. Vanar sena, along with shri Ram and Laxman, Reach Lanka. Shri Ram sends Angad to Ravan's court as a messenger.
Episode 41- Angad successfully stands up to Ravan but Ravan will not make peace. The war begins.

Lanka Kaand (Episode 42 to Episode 47)
Episode 42- Prahast, Ravan’s son withdraws his participation in the battle, much to Ravan’s dismay. Meghnad kills Laxman with a celestial weapon. Lord Hanuman goes in search of snajeevni booti.
Episode 43- Laxman is cured and resumes the war. Ravan wakes up his second brother Kumbhkaran, and tells about the conflict with Ram. Kumbhkaran advices Ravan to go for peace.
Episode 44- Kumbhkaran goes in the battle ground, talks to his brother Vibhishan and wages a war with lord Ram. Kumbhkaran is killed, Ravan is Sad.
Episode 45- Meghnad prays to Lord Shiva for a boon, but does not receive it as Hanuman interrupts him. Lakshman and Meghnad wage a war against each other. Meghnad is killed. Ram treats Meghnad's body with honour and returns it to Lanka.
Episode 46- Last day of the great war. Ram And Ravan fight face to face. Shri Ram Shoots arrow on Ravan's head, but he regrows his head. Vibhishan tells about the boon Ravan had received from lord Brahma. Ram kills Ravan, Vibhishan is crowned As the King of Lanka.
Episode 47- Shri Ram meets devi sita and asks her for Agnipariksha. 14 years of exile are over and Shri Ram goes to Nandigram and meets his Brother Bharat.

Uttar Kaand (Episode 48- final episode) 
Episode 48- Shri Ram comes back to Ayodhya, meets everyone and is crowned as the King of Ayodhya.

Production
The series was produced by B.R Chopra and directed by Ravi Chopra. The executive producer for the series was Bharat Ratan.

Re-run
Ramayan was re-telecast on Zee TV and DD National in the year 2008 from 28 July 2008 to 20 August 2009.

Music
Raj Kamal was the music Director.
Vinod Rathod sang the title song of the series.
Monoj Mishra sang the doha (end song) or the couplet for this series as well as for Vishnu Puran (TV series)
Vinod Rathod sang seven songs in the episodes of Ram-Sita Vivah (episode 13 and 14)
The songs were mainly taken from Shri Ramcharitmanas by Sage Valmiki.
Maya Govind composed the couplets for each episode.

Casting
 Nitish Bharadwaj played Bhagwan Vishnu as well as Ram.
 Smriti Irani played Devi Lakshmi as well as Sita.
 Kinshuk Vaidya was cast as Child Rama.
 Sudhir Dalvi played Brahmadev in this series.
 Samar Jai Singh was replaced by Yashodhan Rana to play Bhagwan Shiva.
 Samar Jai Singh played Meghnad for the series.

Cast
Nitish Bhardwaj as Rama, reincarnation of Lord Vishnu
Smriti Irani as Sita, reincarnation of Goddess Lakshmi
Surendra Pal as Ravana, King of Lanka
Deepak Jethi as Hanuman, devotee of Lord Rama
Bijay Anand as Lakshmana, third brother of Lord Rama
Ayush Pandey as Bharata, second brother of Lord Rama
Amit Pachori as Shatrughna, youngest brother of Lord Rama
Ashwini as Urmila, Lakshman's wife, Sita's sister
Rajani Chandra as Mandavi, Bharat's wife, Shrutakirti's sister
 Malini Kapoor / Arti Puri as Shrutakirti, Shatrughan's wife, Mandavi's sister
Gajendra Chauhan as Dasharatha, Ram, Bharat, Lakshman and Shatrughan's father
Beena Banerjee as Kaushalya, Lord Rama's mother
Jyoti Joshi as Sumitra, Lakshman and Shatrughan's mother
Dolly Minhas as Kaikeyi, Bharat's mother
Tina Ghai as Manthara, Kaikeyi's maid
Pradeep Sharma as Janaka, Sita and Urmila's father
Shalini Kapoor Sagar as Sunaina, Sita and Urmila's mother
Raman Khatri as Kushadhwaja, Mandavi and Shrutakirti's father
Rakesh Vidwa as Shatanand, Devi Ahilya's son, King Janak's guru
A.K. Agnihotri as Janak's minister
Rajita Kocchar as Kaikesi, Ravan's mother
Ramesh Goyal as Maricha, Ravan's maternal uncle
Shashi Sharma as Mandodari, Ravan's wife
Rahul Solapurkar as Kumbhakarna, Ravan's brother
Sandeep Mohan as Vibhishana, Ravan's brother
Dharmesh Tiwari as Vasishtha, Lord Rama's guru
Bhakti Nirula as Arundhati, Vasishth's wife
Rammohan Sharma as Sumantra, Dasrath's minister
Rahul Sood as Prahasta, Ravan's youngest son
Samar Jai Singh as Indrajit, Ravan's eldest son
Deepshikha Nagpal as  Sulochana, Indrajit's wife
Praphulla Pandey as Aksha
Yashodhan Rana as Bhagwan Shiva
Sheetal Bedi as Devi Parvati, Bhagwan Shiva's wife
Kinshuk Vaidya as Child Rama
Sudhir Dalvi as Brahmadev
Kishore Puri as Devraj Indra
Sunil Nagar as Varunadev
Sanjay Swaraj as Maharishi Gautama Maharishi, Devi Ahilya's husband
Shankar Nagre as Ahiravana, Ravan's brother
Sagar Salunkhe as Parashurama
Suhas Khandke as Vasuki, father of Sulochana
Javed Khan as Vishwamitra, Ram and Lakshman's guru
Mona Parekh as Rumā, Sugriv's wife
Manish Garg as Vishvabandhu, Ayodhya's royal poet

Ramayan (2002 TV series) & Vishnu Puran (2000 TV series)

Actors who played same characters in both series
Nitish Bharadwaj played Ram and Vishnu in both the series.
Ayush Pandey played Bharat in both the Series.
Pradeep Sharma played Janak in both the series.
Javed Khan played Vishwamitra in both the series.
Dolly Minas played Kaikeyi in both the series.
Tina Ghai played Manthara in both the series.
Shashi Sharma played Mandodari in both the series.
Sudhir Dalvi played Brahma in both the series.
Rajita Kocchar played Kaikesi in both the series.

Actors who changed their roles
Samar Jai Singh played Shiva in Vishnupuran and Meghnad in Ramayan.
Surendra Pal played Shukracharya in Vishnupuran and Ravan in Ramayan.
Dharmesh Tiwari played Sumant in Vishnupuran and Vashishth in Ramayan.
Amit Pachori played Laxman in Vishnupuran and Shatrughan in Ramayan.
Sagar Salunkhe played Vishwamitra in Vishnupuran and Parshuram in Ramayan.
Bijay Anand played young meghnad in Vishnupuran and Laxman in Ramayan.
Sandeep Mohan played Indra in Vishnupuran and Vibhishan in Ramayan.
Deepak Jethi played Kaalketu in Vishnupuran and Hanuman in Ramayan.

Reception
Even though Ramayan did not prove to be as successful as Mahabharat (1988 TV series) but it did become popular. Within a year, B.R Films had released 48 episodes of the series. In May 2003, it was consistently in Zee's top ten ratings. Although its a forgotten serial of the old era, It was one of the most watched tv serial during 2002-2003.

While working on the sets of Ramayan, In an interview, said Ravi Chopra "Because of the phenomenal success of Mahabharata," , "The expectations from our Ramayana are very high. We have once again Nitish Bharadwaj playing the main role of Ram and Smriti Malhotra-Irani is Sita. We have better technology today and better facilities than when we made our first epic. I have depended mainly on the original Valmiki Ramayana and the Ramcharit-Manas of Tulsidas. At the very outset, I am planning to outline the value of Maryada, which is an entirely Indian concept and is epitomised by Ram, who is called Maryada Purushottam. Nitish Bharadwaj, who also contributes to the script with his inputs of research on the character of Ram, will define Maryada, a value which sets out the civilised limits and self-imposed controls of behaviour for people who want to live enlightened lives. Such explanations will enrich the narrative immeasurably.

"My sets are designed with great attention to detail. The costume team works closely with us. We have used references from sculptures, frescoes, temple carvings and manuscripts while designing of ambience, which is rich and ornate. Ram Govind is doing the script. We normally get the script of ten episodes ready and plan the look and feel of the serial. In mythologicals, casting and dialogues have to be perfect. The success of our Mahabharata was mainly due to excellence in these two areas. Rahi Masoom Raza wrote brilliant dialogues which linked eternal values from the epic to modern living and the result was almost electric. Even in Ramayana, the effort is to apply modern yardsticks to old values and to justify why characters took particular actions though they may seem incorrect in the present day context.

"Today, television is a game of numbers. Everything rests on how much money a serial makes and what TRPs it gets. The making of Ramayana is an opportunity to combine beauty, glamour, values, beautiful language, beautiful relationships, memorable visuals and of course stories which touch every heart. Mahabharata and Ramayana are fountains of eternal wisdom and immortal values. The narratives and the characters who play them out run in the blood of every Indian. Epics give a special fragrance to the Indian soil. They give all religions in India their soul and our culture is rich and scintillating because of them. Stories can be retold on television in every decade without losing any freshness. I’m fortunate to do this!"

References

External links
Watch Ramayana

Zee TV original programming
2001 Indian television series debuts
Television series based on the Ramayana